War Photographer is a documentary by Christian Frei about the photographer James Nachtwey. As well as telling the story of an iconic man in the field of war photography, the film addresses the broader scope of ideas common to all those involved in war journalism, as well as the issues that they cover.

The documentary won a 2003 Peabody Award, and was nominated for an Academy Award in 2002 and an Emmy Award in 2004. It also won or was nominated for more than 40 other awards internationally.

Synopsis 
One of the main themes of the documentary is the level to which a journalist should become involved in the events that they are there to document. James Nachtwey credits the intimacy of his photography to his emphasis on establishing a rapport with his subjects, often despite a significant language barrier. Des Wright, a cameraman with Reuters, describes the problem of being too far removed from what is happening.  Discussing a video reel of President Suharto's resignation and a police crackdown on protestors, he notes: "[Some journalists] say, 'I'm sorry, I'm a journalist, I'm not a part of this.' And I say, but you are a part of it. I think a lot of people would be quite happy for that man to be killed so they can get the particular picture that they want."

The documentary uses footage filmed with a small "microcam" video camera mounted on Nachtwey's SLR cameras. This allows the viewer to see the events from the perspective of the photographer.

Events and locations depicted in the film 
 Post-war Kosovo
 Poverty and riots in Jakarta, Indonesia 
 Ramallah, the West Bank
 A sulfur mine at Ijen in East Java, Indonesia
 New York City, New York, United States
 Hamburg, Germany
 Thokoza, South Africa

Awards
2003 Peabody Award
Nominated for an Academy Award, 2002
Nominated for an Emmy Award, 2004

Reception 
War Photographer has an approval rating of 80% on review aggregator website Rotten Tomatoes, based on 25 reviews, and an average rating of 6.92/10. The website's critical consensus states, "War Photographer offers a breathtakingly intimate look at life on the front lines by distilling the horror and terrible beauty captured while paying testament to war's awful cost". Metacritic assigned the film a weighted average score of 79 out of 100, based on 12 critics, indicating "generally favorable reviews".

Edward Guthmann from the San Francisco Chronicle has emphasized that the film appeals to the spectators’ sense for compassion:

Ken Fox has estimated the humanistic approach of the film and of the work of James Nachtwey:

Similar Peter Rainer from New York:

Notes

External links 

 

2001 films
2001 documentary films
2000s English-language films
2000s German-language films
Swiss documentary films
Films shot in Indonesia
Films directed by Christian Frei
Documentary films about war photographers
2001 multilingual films
Swiss multilingual films